Patrick Warren (born March 26, 1957) is an American musician, composer, and record producer. He is known for his work on the films Magnolia, Fifty Shades of Grey, Boogie Nights and Red State, as well as the television series True Detective for which he composed and performed his original music for which he was awarded an Emmy. He composed the theme song and the original score to the Showtime original series The Chi. As a recording artist, he has worked with Michael Penn, Fiona Apple, The Wallflowers, Eagle-Eye Cherry, Stevie Nicks, and Liz Phair. As a touring musician, he has toured with Bob Dylan, Bruce Springsteen, and Lana Del Rey. He is globally known as an expert Chamberlin artist.

Chamberlin
Warren is an accomplished pianist and keyboardist, who has performed on Grammy Award-winning records and Emmy Award-winning television series, as well as dozens of feature films including Pleasantville and Across the Universe. Warren is also among the top Chamberlin artists in the world. The Chamberlin is an electro-mechanical keyboard that was first introduced in 1948. Warren has played Chamberlin on many albums including Fiona Apple's 1996 debut Tidal, the song "Road Trippin'" by the Red Hot Chili Peppers for their 1999 album Californication, and Lucinda Williams' Down Where the Spirit Meets the Bone. from 2014.

Collaborations 
With Michael Penn
 March (RCA Records, 1989)
 Free-for-All (RCA Records, 1992)
 Resigned (Epic Records, 1997)
 Mr. Hollywood Jr., 1947 (Mimeograph Records, 2005)

With Nerina Pallot
 Fires (Idaho Records, 2005)

With Michelle Branch
 The Spirit Room (Warner Bros. Records, 2001)
 Hotel Paper (Maverick Records, 2003)

With Taylor Hicks
 Taylor Hicks (Arista Records, 2006)

With Rod Stewart
 Still the Same... Great Rock Classics of Our Time (J Records, 2006)

With Rosanne Cash
 She Remembers Everything (Blue Note Records, 2018)

With Bonnie Raitt
 Slipstream (Redwing Records, 2012)
 Dig In Deep (Redwing Records, 2016)

With LeAnn Rimes
 What a Wonderful World (Asylum Records, 2004)

With Rob Thomas
 Cradlesong (Atlantic Records, 2009)
 Someday (Atlantic Records, 2010)

With Avril Lavigne
 Under My Skin (RCA Records, 2004)

With Tracy Chapman
 Telling Stories (Elektra Records, 2000)
 Let It Rain (Elektra Records, 2002)

With Joe Cocker
 Respect Yourself (EMI, 2002)

With Neil Diamond
 12 Songs (Columbia Records, 2005)

With Macy Gray
 On How Life Is (Epic Records, 1999)

With Melissa Etheridge
 Breakdown (Island Records, 1999)
 Lucky (Island Records, 2004)

With Fiona Apple
 Tidal (Columbia Records, 1996)
 When the Pawn... (Epic Records, 1999)
 Extraordinary Machine (Epic Records, 2005)

With Sam Phillips
 Omnipop (It's Only a Flesh Wound Lambchop) (Virgin Records, 1996)
 A Boot and a Shoe (Nonesuch Records, 2004)
 Don't Do Anything (Nonesuch Records, 2008)

With Rodney Crowell
 Sex & Gasoline (Yep Roc Records, 2008)

With Aaron Neville
 I Know I've Been Changed (EMI, 2010)

With Lisa Marie Presley
 To Whom It May Concern (Capitol Records, 2003)
 Storm & Grace (Universal Republic, 2008)

With Stevie Nicks
 Trouble in Shangri-La (Reprise Records, 2001)

With Chris Cornell
 Higher Truth (UM, 2015)

With Shelby Lynne
 Love, Shelby (Island Records, 2001)

With Beth Hart
 Screamin' for My Supper (Atlantic Records, 1999)
 Leave the Light On (Warner Bros., Records, 2003)

With Sara Bareilles
 Amidst the Chaos (Epic Records, 2019)

With Marc Cohn
 Join the Parade (Decca Records, 2007)

With Tom Waits
 Bad as Me (Anti-, 2011)

With Aimee Mann
 Bachelor No. 2 or, the Last Remains of the Dodo (V2 Records, 2000)
 Lost in Space (V2 Records, 2002)
 One More Drifter in the Snow (SuperEgo Records, 2006)

With Jewel
 0304 (Atlantic Records, 2003)

With Ronan Keating
 Fires (Polydor Records, 2012)

With Bob Dylan
 Christmas in the Heart (Columbia Records, 2009)

With Tift Merritt
 Tambourine (Lost Highway Records, 2004)
 Another Country (Fantasy Records, 2008)

With Bruce Springsteen
 Magic (Columbia Records, 2007)
 Working on a Dream (Columbia Records, 2009)
American Beauty (EP) (Columbia Records, 2014)

With Joan Baez
 Whistle Down the Wind (Proper Records, 2018)

With Graham Nash
 This Path Tonight (Blue Castle, 2016)
With Elisa
 Ritorno al futuro/Back to the Future (Island Records, 2022)

References

External links
 Patrick Warren on AllMusic
 

1957 births
Living people